Christ Church London  (also commonly known as Christ Church; and shorthand CCL), founded 2004, is a Christian church that meets at several locations across London, United Kingdom.

As Christians, Christ Church London has a large focus on sharing their faith with non-Christians by building community through holding a large number of social events throughout the year, which allow people to invite friends into the church community.

Christ Church London is a multicultural community with attendees from all over the world.

History
Christ Church London was founded in October 2004 by David Stroud, who moved from Birmingham to start the church, and recruited Adrian Holloway and Rhys Scott to be part of the church-planting team. The church officially launched in 2005 at the New Connaught Rooms in Covent Garden and has since relocated a number of times as the church has grown. They now meet in separate locations.

Present

Sundays
Christ Church London holds multiple  services every Sunday across multiple sites.

The service often begins with about half an hour of worship using largely contemporary Christian music, including songs by artists such as Chris Tomlin and Hillsong, together with original songs written by members of the Christ Church London Worship Team. This is then followed by approximately half an hour of preaching by a church elder or guest speaker, with a sermon centred on a passage of Biblical scripture. At the end of the service, people are often given the opportunity to be prayed for and to stay for refreshments, or after church socials.

Special Sundays
Christ Church London holds a number of special Sunday meetings throughout the year, including three baptismal services, two dedication services, two services celebrating London, and a Christmas Carol Service. They also have around six guest speakers each year.

Move to more services in more locations
When church attendance continued to grow, Christ Church London announced it would move from the Mermaid Theatre in Blackfriars to the Peacock Theatre in Holborn and also to several satellite locations across London.

Connect Groups
Christ Church London has around 30 Connect Groups with more being added regularly. They are groups where people can build community and use their skills and passions to contribute to the flourishing of London life. These groups gather around a common cause; a people, a place, or a passion. Some examples include groups for those in the workplace, groups for students, groups for studying the Bible deeper, groups for those involved in social justice, and groups for creatives.

Alpha
Christ Church London hosts the Alpha course several times a year for non-Christians and Christians. They are run throughout the week across London for eight consecutive weeks. Since 2004, over 2000 people in total have attended Alpha at Christ Church London.

Notable Alpha launches
Christ Church London hosts two or three launches per Alpha course, which are also held at Sway Bar in Covent Garden.

3 October 2007: Simon Thomas, former Blue Peter presenter.

5 October 2009: Patrick Dixon, chairman of Global Change Ltd and founder of the international AIDS charity, ACET.

7 October 2009: Alister McGrath, author of The Dawkins Delusion?.

20 January 2010: Jo Enright, comedian and actress, who has appeared in Peter Kay's Phoenix Nights and I'm Alan Partridge.

21 January 2010: Andy Duncan, chief executive of Channel 4.

19 April 2010: Baroness Cox, founder and chief executive of Humanitarian Aid Relief Trust.

4 October 2010: Dr Ard Louis, theoretical physicist at the University of Oxford.

Students' Ministry
Due to its location in the centre of London, Christ Church attracts many students from the nearby universities, mainly from colleges of the University of London.

New students are "built in" as active members by the Student Team by one-on-one coffees and social student lunches. Furthermore, the team organises one-on-one discipleship courses, prayer and praise evenings, apologetics training, Christian Union leaders Forums, student bible study and student weekends away.

List of teams at Christ Church London
At Christ Church London, there are a large number of people who serve and help the running of the service every Sunday. In 2006, there were 220 people who were actively serving on at least one of the ChristChurch teams.

Teams at Christ Church London include:

 Welcome Team
 Worship Team
 Hospitality Team
 Tech Team
 Prayer Team

 Crèche (0-3)
 Kids (3-8)
 Youth (8+)
 Students

See also
 Churches which do not meet in traditional Church buildings

References

External links
 ChristChurch London official website
 The City, ChristChurch London social networking website
 

Churches in the City of London
Christianity in London
Christian organizations established in 2004
British New Church Movement
Evangelical churches in London